The 16th Toronto Film Critics Association Awards, honoring the best in film for 2012, were given on December 18, 2012.

Through a naming rights sponsorship with Rogers the Best Canadian Film Award prize money was raised to C$100,000 from $15,000 in 2010 and $10,000 prior to that, while the two runners-up took $5,000 each.  It is now the largest film prize in Canada.

Winners
Best Actor:
Denis Lavant – Holy Motors 
Runners-Up: Daniel Day-Lewis – Lincoln and Joaquin Phoenix – The Master

Best Actress:
Rachel Weisz – The Deep Blue Sea
Runners-Up: Jessica Chastain – Zero Dark Thirty and Emmanuelle Riva – Amour

Best Animated Film: 
ParaNorman
Runners-Up: Brave and Frankenweenie

Best Director: 
Paul Thomas Anderson – The Master
Runners-Up: Kathryn Bigelow – Zero Dark Thirty and Leos Carax – Holy Motors

Best Documentary Film: 
Stories We Tell
Runners-Up: The Queen of Versailles and Searching for Sugar Man

Best Film:
The Master
Runners-Up: Amour and Zero Dark ThirtyBest First Feature (tie): 
Beasts of the Southern Wild
Beyond the Black Rainbow
Runner-Up: The Cabin in the WoodsBest Foreign Language Film: 
Amour • Austria/France/Germany
Runners-Up: Holy Motors • France/Germany and Tabu • PortugalBest Screenplay:The Master – Paul Thomas Anderson 
Runners-Up: Lincoln – Tony Kushner and Zero Dark Thirty – Mark BoalBest Supporting Actor:Philip Seymour Hoffman – The Master
Runners-Up: Javier Bardem – Skyfall and Tommy Lee Jones – LincolnBest Supporting Actress:Gina Gershon – Killer Joe 
Runners-Up: Amy Adams – The Master, Ann Dowd – Compliance and Anne Hathaway – Les MisérablesRogers Canadian Film Award:' Sarah Polley - Stories We Tell.
Runners-Up: Denis Côté - Bestiaire, Michael Dowse -Goon''

References

2012
2012 film awards
2012 in Toronto
2012 in Canadian cinema